is an underground metro station located in Chikusa-ku, Nagoya, Aichi Prefecture, Japan operated by the Nagoya Municipal Subway's Higashiyama Line.  It is located 16.2 rail kilometers from the terminus of the Higashiyama Line at Takabata Station. This station provides access to Sugiyama Jogakuen University.

History
Hoshigaoka Station was opened on 30 March 1967.

Lines

 (Station number: H18)

Layout
Hoshigaoka Station

Platforms

Surrounding area 
Higashiyama Zoo and Botanical Gardens (東山動植物園)
Sugiyama Jogakuen University (椙山女学園大学)
Hoshigaoka Mitsukoshi （星ヶ丘三越）

References

External links

 Hoshigaoka Station official web site 

Chikusa-ku, Nagoya
Railway stations in Japan opened in 1967
Railway stations in Aichi Prefecture